Prachi Desai (born 12 September 1988), is an Indian actress who works in Hindi films and television. She started her television career as a lead in the successful TV drama Kasam Se on Zee TV. She made her Bollywood debut in the 2008 film Rock On!!. Her other notable films include Life Partner (2009), Once Upon a Time in Mumbaai (2010), Bol Bachchan (2012) and I, Me Aur Main (2013). She is also the endorser, spokesperson, brand ambassador and the face of Goa Tourism and Neutrogena products in India. Desai is also a brand ambassador of Lux Lyra. In an interview of April 2021, she opened up about her casting couch experience for a big film.

Early life and background 
Desai was born in Surat, Gujarat, to Niranjan Desai and Ameeta Desai. She has one sister named Esha Desai.

Desai studied in St. Joseph Convent School, Panchgani and completed her schooling until ninth grade in Surat. She completed her higher studies in Sinhagad College in Pune.

Career

Television career and breakthrough (2006-2008)
In 2006, Desai got selected to play the lead role in Ekta Kapoor's television drama, Kasamh Se. She was cast as Bani, opposite TV actor Ram Kapoor. It was her acting debut.The show won her several awards, including the Indian Telly Award for Best Actress in a Lead Role.

Desai then entered Jhalak Dikhhla Jaa, the Indian version of BBC Strictly Come Dancing on 7 September 2007 with choreographer Deepak Singh. Desai was eliminated on 10 November 2007, but entered the contest again via a wildcard entry and ultimately won the competition. Desai was awarded the Dancing Star of Jhalak Dikhhla Jaa.

Desai also appeared in two episodes of the Star Plus television series Kasauti Zindagi Ki in a cameo. She portrayed a student at Prerna's school.

Film debut and success (2008-2016)

Desai then made the transition to the film industry in 2008. Her first film was Rock On!! (2008), directed by Abhishek Kapoor, where she played the wife of Farhan Akhtar. Desai had to leave Kasamh Se to act in Rock On.

Her next film was Life Partner (2009) with Tushhar Kapoor,Genelia D'Souza,Fardeen Khan,Govinda and Amrita Rao.

In July 2010, she appeared in Once Upon a Time in Mumbaai with Ajay Devgan, Emraan Hashmi and Kangana Ranaut.

In 2010 she shot with Rajeev Khandelwal for Vikram Tuli's film called Main Jokerr  which was to be released in 2011 but film never released due to its title problems.

In 2012, she appeared in Teri Meri Kahaani in a cameo role. Desai then appeared in a lead role in Bol Bachchan opposite Abhishek Bachchan, along with Ajay Devgn and Asin. The film proved to be Desai's biggest box office success until date.

Desai next appeared in I, Me Aur Main (2013) with John Abraham and Chitrangada Singh. She did another film, Policegiri with Sanjay Dutt. 

In 2014, she appeared in an item number for Ek Villain in a song called "Awari".

In 2016, Desai played former cricket captain Mohammad Azharuddin's wife, Naureen in his biopic film, Azhar opposite Emraan Hashmi. She again played the wife of Farhan Akhtar in Rock On 2, a sequel to Rock On!!. The film was released on 11 November 2016.

Hiatus, return and further career (2017-present)
Desai returned to the silver screen after almost 4 years with the Zee 5 film 'Silence...Can You Hear It?' released on 26 March 2021 also starring Manoj Bajpai, Arjun Mathur, Sahil Vaid, Vaquar Sheikh and Barkha Singh.

She also performed in a music video, Rihaee with Mr.World 2016 Rohit Khandelwal which released on 22 June 2021. The song was sung by singer Yaseer Desai. The song was well appreciated by the audience.

On 24 June 2022 she was seen in Hindi film Forensic,a remake of Malayalam film co-starring Vikrant Massey and Radhika Apte, where she played the role of Dr.Ranjana.

At Amazon Prime Meeting in 2022 it was revealed that Desai will be making her Telugu debut with supernatural web series Dhootha with Naga Chaitanya and Parvathy.

She is even committed to star as a lead actress in the dark fantasy movie - Kosha, which is directed by Amman Advaita and produced by Abhay Raj Kanwar.

Filmography

Films

Television

Music videos

Awards and nominations

Notes

References

External links 

 
 

Living people
1987 births
People from Surat
Actresses from Gujarat
Indian television actresses
Indian film actresses
Actresses in Hindi cinema
Actresses in Gujarati cinema
21st-century Indian actresses
Reality dancing competition winners
International Indian Film Academy Awards winners
Zee Cine Awards winners
Gujarati people